Kho-Kho is a 2021 Indian Malayalam-language sports drama film written and directed by Rahul Riji Nair starring Rajisha Vijayan, Mamitha Baiju and produced by First Print Studios. The film received a TRP (Television Rating Points) of 12.7 points (as per U+R BARC data) during its World Television Premiere, making it the highest ever for a female-centric Malayalam film.  The film also entered the list of Top 15 Malayalam films with the highest TRPs at that time.

Synopsis
The story revolves around Maria Francis, a Kho kho school coach. The film tells the story of the formation of a team of kho kho players in a school where only girls study and the events that follow. In the end she is very happy and proud to learn that the most promising player of her former Kho Kho school team has gotten into the national Kho Kho team.

Cast
 Rajisha Vijayan as Maria Francis, a former athlete and a physical education teacher
 Mamitha Baiju as Anju, captain of school Kho Kho team
 Renjit Shekar Nair as Peon Shivaprasad, manager of the team
 Venkitesh VP as Ben, Maria's husband who is a former athlete and a businessman 
 Vettukili Prakash as Francis, Maria's father
 Rahul Riji Nair as Vinod
 Arjun Ranjan as Sports Official
 Sreejith Babu
 Jeo Baby (cameo)
 Geethi Sangeetha (cameo)

Production
In August 2020,  Rahul Riji Nair announced that the next venture will be a sports movie one which will star Rajisha Vijayan in the lead role. After the Finals, Rajisha Vijayan returns with another sports film. Rajisha Vijayan played the lede role of a Kho Kho coach in the movie. Tobin Thomas is the cinematographer, Sidhartha Pradeep is the music director and Christy Sebastian is the editor.

Awards 
Kerala Film Critics Award 2020
 Best Supporting Actress : Mamitha Baiju
 Special Jury Award : Rahul Riji Nair

Music

The film's soundtrack album and score was composed by music director Sidhartha Pradeep. The Malayalam lyrics on the album were penned by writers Rahul Riji Nair, Arjun Ranjan and Vinayak Sasikumar, and the English rap lyrics by Aditi Nair R. The album was launched on 24 March 2021 by 123 Musix.

Release
The film was released on 2021 April 14. On 20 April, the film was withdrawn from the theatures due to covid crisis.

Reception
Sujit Chandrakumar of Times of India described Kho Kho as "an inspirational sports drama". Writing for Cinema Express, Sajin Shrijith lauded the film as a predictable but empowering sports drama. "The film doesn’t bring anything new to the table in terms of storytelling. But at the same time, one wonders how many new ways can one narrate a sports drama, especially when motivation is its primary intention". He rated it as a film worth watching. In a review for Firstpost Anna MM Vetticad wrote,"Kho Kho stumbles intermittently when it gets too didactic or veers away from its slice-of-life narrative style. Nonetheless, it achieves a charming overall sweetness and positivity".

References

External links
 
 

2021 films
2021 drama films
2020s Malayalam-language films
2020s sports drama films
Indian sports drama films